Filiberto Rivera (born September 28, 1982), also known as "Fili", is a Puerto Rican professional basketball player who plays for Cangrejeros de Santurce of the BSN in Puerto Rico. Rivera has played in the NCAA, NJCAA and the Baloncesto Superior Nacional (BSN), and has also played internationally in Germany and Italy. He was a member of the Puerto Rican National Team.

Biography

Amateur career
Rivera has played in the National Superior Basketball League of Puerto Rico since 1999. Rivera won Rookie of the Year in 2000 for National Superior Basketball League of Puerto Rico.

Rivera had a notable college career where he was named First Team NJCAA All-American, Junior College Player of the Year (2002–03), and First Team All-WAC his junior and senior seasons. Ranks third on University of Texas El Paso all-time lists in career assists (381)and free throw percentage (.815). Finished collegiate career at Texas-El Paso after playing first two seasons at Southeastern Community College in West Burlington, Iowa.

During his senior year (2004–05), Rivera averaged 13.5 points while leading the WAC and ranking seventh nationally in assists (7.2 apg). Also paced the conference in free throw shooting (.853) and ranked sixth in steals (1.3 spg). Season total of 229 assists set a school record. Dished out 10 or more assists five times and posted two double-doubles. Recorded a school single-game record 18 assists versus zero turnovers vs. Louisiana Tech. Tallied 23 points and six assists at Nevada. Posted 19 points and 12 assists vs. Fresno State. Scored 21 points and grabbed a career-high seven steals at San Jose State. Registered a career-high 32 points vs. Boise State in the WAC tournament title game. Earned WAC Tournament MVP honors.

During his junior year (2003–04), Rivera averaged 11.2 points, 3.1 rebounds, 4.8 assists (third in the WAC) and 1.7 steals (fourth). Scored in double figures in 21 games. Recorded season-high 22 points at San Jose State. Tallied 14 points and eight assists vs. Rutgers. Named to the WAC All-Tournament team after averaging 9.3 points, 6.0 rebounds and 4.7 assists in three games. Registered 14 points, six assists, and a career-high nine rebounds vs. Nevada in the WAC Tournament title game. Scored 12 points and grabbed six assists vs. Maryland in the first round of the NCAA Tournament.

During his sophomore year (2002–03), at Southeastern Community College (Iowa), Rivera averaged 16.2 points and 6.7 assists. Helped lead Southeastern to a 37-1 record and a NJCAA Tournament championship. Averaged 17.4 points during the NJCAA Tournament on his way to MVP honors. Led team with 18 points in the title game vs. San Jacinto (Tex.). Set season-high with 37 points vs. Iowa Western. Named a First Team NJCAA All-American and Junior College Player of the Year.

During his freshman year (2001–02), Rivera averaged 11.9 points and a team-high 5.1 assists. Ranked third on the team in scoring and led the squad in average steals. Helped team to a 25-10 overall record.

NBA and Europe
During the summer of 2005, Filiberto participated in the Summer Pro League with the Dallas Mavericks and Cleveland Cavaliers.

During the summer of 2006, Rivera represented Puerto Rico in the Basketball World Championship 2006 and 2006 Central American and Caribbean Games where Puerto Rico won the Gold Medal.

During the 2006–2007 season, Rivera played with Artland Dragons of the German Bundesliga. The Dragons were regarded as a "Cinderella team" entering the playoffs, winning the first round against Alba Berlin. Rivera led the team in the league's semifinal, scoring sixteen points, five rebounds and three assists in a victory over the Koeln the fifth and last game of the series. Rivera had an average of 15.5 points, 4.3 rebounds and 6.0 prior to the finals.

During Summer of 2007, he was invited to participate with the Chicago Bulls during the Pepsi Pro Summer League, but did not play due to injury.

He started the 2007/08 season in Italy with Eldo Basket Napoli left on December 12, and joined AEK Athens BC

Has a child that he does not take care of but the child is well taken care of.

On 2006 Rivera participated in the BSN, where he led the team to the league's championship. On January 29, 2008, the Carolina Giants announced that they began negotiations with Rivera. On January 31, 2008 the team officially announced Rivera's signing.

Prior to 2010–2011 season Rivera has signed with Israeli club Bnei HaSharon

On October 28, 2016, Rivera parted ways with the German team Science City Jena.

Career stats
Rivera's NCAA stats in 64 games are 790 points with a 12.3 PPG, 381 assists with a 6.0 APG, 184 rebounds with a 2.9 RPG, 97 steals with a 1.5 SPG, .452 field goal percentage, .815 free-throw percentage, and .360 3-point percentage. Rivera's NJCAA stats in 57 games are 830 points with a 14.6 PPG, 349 assists with a 6.1 APG, 153 rebounds with a 2.7 RPG, 142 steals with a 2.5 SPG, .460 field goal percentage, .778 free-throw percentage, and .269 3-point percentage.

References

External links
 Latinbasket.com profile
 RealGM profile

1982 births
Living people
2006 FIBA World Championship players
2010 FIBA World Championship players
AEK B.C. players
Ángeles de Puebla (basketball) players
Artland Dragons players
Atléticos de San Germán players
Baloncesto Superior Nacional players
Basket Napoli players
Basketball players at the 2011 Pan American Games
Bnei HaSharon players
Brose Bamberg players
Caciques de Humacao players
Central American and Caribbean Games gold medalists for Puerto Rico
Central American and Caribbean Games medalists in basketball
Competitors at the 2006 Central American and Caribbean Games
Competitors at the 2010 Central American and Caribbean Games
Fuerza Regia de Monterrey players
Halcones Rojos Veracruz players
Indios de Mayagüez basketball players
Israeli Basketball Premier League players
Maratonistas de Coamo players
Marinos B.B.C. players
Pan American Games gold medalists for Puerto Rico
Pan American Games medalists in basketball
Panteras de Aguascalientes players
People from Carolina, Puerto Rico
Plateros de Fresnillo players
Point guards
Puerto Rican expatriate basketball people in Germany
Puerto Rican expatriate basketball people in Mexico
Puerto Rican expatriate basketball people in Venezuela
Puerto Rican men's basketball players
Puerto Rico men's national basketball team players
Santeros de Aguada basketball players
Science City Jena players
Southeastern Blackhawks men's basketball players
UTEP Miners men's basketball players
Medalists at the 2011 Pan American Games